Memel, a name derived from the Couronian-Latvian memelis, mimelis, mēms for "mute, silent", may refer to:

Memel, East Prussia, Germany, now Klaipėda, Lithuania
Memelburg, (Klaipėda Castle), the Ordensburg in Memel, a castle built in 1252 by Teutonic Knights which was the nucleus for the city
Memel Territory (Klaipėda Region), (Memelland), the area separated from Germany by the Treaty of Versailles, later called Klaipėda Region
Battle of Memel (disambiguation)
Neman (German Memel), part of a river in East Prussia, Germany, mentioned in the Deutschlandlied (1841) as the eastern border of Germany
Nemunėlis River (German Memele, Latvian Mēmele) in northern Lithuania and southern Latvia
Memel, Free State, a village in the Free State Province of South Africa
, a German cargo ship in service 1934–1945
The indigenous name of Goat Island, New South Wales, Australia